Corrente River or Correntes River may refer to:
 Corrente River (Bahia), Bahia, Brazil
 Corrente River (Doce River), Minas Gerais, Brazil
 Corrente River (Paranã River), Goiás, Brazil
 Corrente River (Paranaíba River), Goiás, Brazil
 Corrente River (Piauí), Piauí, Brazil
 Corrente River (Rio do Peixe), Minas Gerais, Brazil
 Correntes River (Maranhão), Maranhão, Brazil
 Correntes River (Mato Grosso), Mato Grosso, Brazil
 Correntes River (Santa Catarina), Santa Catarina, Brazil